The men's 200 metre breaststroke competition of the swimming events at the 1983 Pan American Games took place on 20 August. The last Pan American Games champion was Steve Lundquist of US.

This race consisted of four lengths of the pool, all in breaststroke.

Results
All times are in minutes and seconds.

Heats

Final 
The final was held on August 20.

References

Swimming at the 1983 Pan American Games